The Garnedd-Wen Formation (also known as the Garnedd-Wen Beds) is an Ordovician lithostratigraphic group (a sequence of rock strata) in Mid Wales. The rock of the formation is a mixture of mudstones, siltstones, fine- to coarse-grained sandstones, greywackes and conglomerates. The formation extends from Dinas Mawddwy in the north-east to Tywyn in the south-west.

Geography 
The Garnedd-Wen Formation is the upper strata of rock across a wide part of western Mid Wales. In particular, it forms the upper rock beds of the Tarren Hills on the south side of the Bala Fault, west of Talyllyn Lake.

References

Ordovician System of Europe
Upper Ordovician Series
Rock formations of Wales